RFA Salvigil (A501) was a salvage vessel of the Royal Fleet Auxiliary.

Salvigil was built by Wm. Simons & Co. Ltd. of Renfrew, launched on 30 April 1945, and commissioned on 23 May 1945. Decommissioned in 1965, the ship was sold into commercial service in May 1965 and was renamed Nisos Salamis. Scrapping began at Perama on 12 October 1972.	

King Salvor-class salvage vessels
Ships built on the River Clyde
1945 ships